Vanadyl perchlorate or vanadyl triperchlorate is a golden yellow coloured liquid or crystalline compound of vanadium, oxygen and perchlorate group.  The substance consists of molecules covalently bound and is quite volatile.

Formation
Vanadyl perchlorate can be made by reacting vanadium pentoxide with dichlorine heptoxide at 5 °C.  It is purified by distillation under a  vacuum and recrystallisation at 21 °C.

A solution of vanadium(V) perchlorate can be made by dissolving vanadium pentoxide in perchloric acid. 

The reaction of vanadium pentoxide and dichlorine hexoxide could produce VO(ClO4)3:

 2 V2O5 + 12 Cl2O6 → 4 VO(ClO4)3 + 12 ClO2 + 3 O2

Properties
It can react with vanadium oxychloride to form another vanadyl perchlorate (VO2ClO4): 
 4 VO(ClO4)3 + 2 VOCl3 → 6 VO2ClO4 + 6 ClO2 + 3 Cl2 + 3 O2

Related
Other perchlorates include pervanadyl perchlorate, also known as dioxovanadium perchlorate, which contains VO2+ ions, vanadyl diperchlorate, oxovanadium perchlorate or vanadium(IV) perchlorate, and VO(ClO4)2, which dissolves in water. Vanadic perchlorate, also known as vanadium(III) perchlorate solution in water, is a green-tinged blue colour, significantly different to most other V(III) solutions, which are complexed.

References

Perchlorates
Vanadium(V) compounds
Vanadyl compounds